This is a list of People's Artist of the Azerbaijani SSR (1931–1990); which after 1998, was renamed and rededicated as the People's Artist of Azerbaijan to reflect the new country leadership.

1930s

1931 

 Gurban Pirimov (1880–1965), tarist

1932 

  (1888–1975), theater actor, playwright
 Hovhannes Abelian (1865–1936), film and theater actor
 Huseyngulu Sarabski (1879–1945), opera singer (tenor)

1933 

 Mirzaagha Aliyev (1883–1954), film and theater actor

1934 

 Reinhold Glière (1875–1956), composer
 Shovkat Mammadova (1897–1981), opera singer
  (1882–1967), opera singer

1935 

  (1894–?), actress
 Vahram Papazian (1888–1968), actor

1936 

 Marziyya Davudova (1901–1962), actress
 Abbas Mirza Sharifzadeh (1893–1938), theater actor and director
 , director

1937 

 Uzeyir Hajibeyov (1885–1948), composer, conductor, writer, columnist, playwright and teacher

1938 

 Huseynagha Hajibababeyov (1898–1972), singer
  (1894–1981), actor
 Sidgi Ruhulla (1886–1959), actor

1940s

1940 

 Alasgar Alakbarov (1910–1963), film and theater actor
 Aghasadyg Garaybeyli (1897–1988), film and theater actor
 Fatma Mukhtarova (1893 or 1898 – 1972), opera singer

1943 

 Gamar Almaszadeh (1915–2006), ballerina
  (1899–1973), film and theater actor
 Adil Isgandarov (1910–1978), director, film and theater actor
  (1896–1956), film and theater actor, director
 Mustafa Mardanov, film and theater actor
 Hagigat Rzayeva (1907–1969), opera singer

1946 

  (1891–1983), theater director

1947 

 Barat Shakinskaya (1914–1999), theater and film actress

1948 

  (1902–1978), film and theater actor

1949 

  (1899–1969), film and theater actor
  (1907–1979), actress
 Ismayil Daghistanli (1907–1980), actor
  (1900–1981), actor
  (1895–1949), actor of theater
 Yeva Olenskaya (1900–1959), actress

1950s

1951 

 Rashid Behbudov (1915–1989), opera singer

1954 

 Aliagha Aghayev (1913–1983), film and theater actor
  (1898–1985), film and theater actor
  (1910–1992), singer

1955 

  (1905–1973), theater actor
 Niyazi (1912–1984), composer and conductor

1956 

  (1904–1971), theater actor

1957 

 Said Rustamov (1907–1983), composer, teacher and conductor

1958 

 Fikret Amirov (1922–1984), composer
 Leyla Vakilova (1927–1999), ballerina
 Gara Garayev (1918–1982), composer
  (1918–1985), actor and director

1959 

  (1915–1980), dancer and choreographer
 Leyla Badirbeyli (1920–1999), film actress
 Amina Dilbazi (1919–2010), dancer

1960s

1960 

 Lutfali Abdullayev (1914–1973), theater and film actor
 Afrasiyab Badalbeyli (1907–1976), composer, conductor, writer and musicologist
 Soltan Hajibeyov (1919–1974), composer
 Hokuma Gurbanova (1913–1988), film actress

1962 

  (1913–1977), actress

1963 

 Jahangir Jahangirov (1921–1992), composer, conductor and choirmaster

1964 

 Franghiz Ahmadova (1928–2011), opera singer
 Shamsi Badalbeyli (1911–1986), theater director
 Rauf Hajiyev (1922–1995), composer
 Tofig Guliyev (1917–2000), composer, pianist and conductor

1966 
 Rza Tahmasib (1894–1980), theater director, actor

1967 
  (1927–1997),  conductor, educator
 Rauf Atakishiyev (1925–1994), pianist and educator
 Zarosh Hamzayeva (1925–2004), actress
 Lutfiyar Imanov (1928–2008), an operatic singer

1968 
  (1906–1973), pianist and educator

1969 
 Firangiz Sharifova (1924–2014), actress and singer

1970s

1970 
 Rafiga Akhundova (1931), Ballerina, choreographer, teacher

1971 
 Ajdar Ibrahimov (1919–1993), filmmaker 
 Muslim Magomayev (1942–2008), Soviet, Azerbaijani and Russian opera and variety singer (baritone), composer 
 Rubaba Muradova (1930–1983), opera singer (mezzo-soprano)

1972 
 Konstantin Adamov (1923), actor and producer
 Safar Aliyeva (1907–1984), pianist and teacher
 Anatoliy Falkovich (1923–1994), actor

1973 
 Akhmad Bakikhanov (1892–1973), tarist
 Lyudmila Sakina (1929–2009), singer
 Aram Khachaturyan (1903–1978)

1974 
 Sofa Bashirzade (1918–2000), actress 
 Malik Dadashov (1924–1996), actor
 Nasiba Zeynalova (1916–2004), actress
Najiba Malikova (1921–1992), actress
 Nina Sarnachkaya (1909–1986), actress

1975 
 Zeynab Khanlarova (1936), opera singer

1976 
 Mukhtar Dadashov (1913–1998), operator, screenwriter, director, actor
 Hasan Sayidbayli (1920–1980), writer, playwright, screenwriter, director
 Tofig Tahgizade (1919–1998), actor, screenwriter, director

1977 
 Khosrov Abdullayev (1926–1980), circus artist, juggler, illusionist

1978 
 Farhad Badalbeyli (1947), pianist
 Bahram Mansurov (1911–1985), Soviet Azerbaijani artist
 Arif Malikov (1933), Soviet Azerbaijani compositor
 Afag Malikova (born 1947), Azerbaijani dancer
 Tamilla Shiraliyeva (1946), Soviet Azerbaijani ballerina, teacher, choreographer

1979 
 Zinovar Gevokrkyan (1920–2005), theater actor
 Yusif Valiyev (1917–1980), Soviet Azerbaijani actor
 Huseynaga Sadigov (1914–1983), Soviet Azerbaijani actor

1980s

1980

1981

1982

1983

1985 

 Amaliya Panahova (1945–2018), Azerbaijani actress and director

1986 

 Khuraman Gasimova (born 1951), Azerbaijani singer and actress

1987 

 Agshin Alizadeh (1937–2014), Soviet Azerbaijani composer
  (1923–1994), Soviet Azerbaijani theater actor, in 1990 he moved to Israel
 Fuad Poladov (1948–2018), Azerbaijani actor
  (1923–2001), Azerbaijani actor
 Khayyam Mirzazade (1935–2018), Soviet Azerbaijani composer
 Ramiz Mustafayev (1926–2008), Soviet Azerbaijani musician
 Chingiz Sadykhov (1929–2017), Azerbaijani musician, pianist

1988 

 Haji Khanmammadov (1918–2005), Azerbaijani and Soviet composer
  (born 1947), Azerbaijani musician

1989 

 Shahmar Alakbarov (1943–1992), Azerbaijani actor and film director
  (born 1938), Azerbaijani singer
 Yashar Nuri (1951–2012), Azerbaijani-Soviet actor
 Islam Rzayev (1934–2008), Azerbaijani singer
 , Soviet Azerbaijani television and film director
  (born 1941), Soviet–Azerbaijani circus artist and animal trainer
  (1926–1994), Soviet–Azerbaijani musician
 , Soviet–Azerbaijani musician
 Alibaba Mammadov (1929–2022), Azerbaijani singer and composer

1990 
 Rafig Huseynov (announcer) (1946–2017), Soviet–Azerbaijani television announcer
  (1920–2010), Soviet–Azerbaijani announcer of Azdevlattele Radio
 Ashraf Abbasov (1920–1992), Soviet Azerbaijani composer
 Yagub Mammadov (singer) (1930–1993), Soviet Azerbaijani mugham singer
 Hajibaba Huseynov (1919–1993), Soviet Azerbaijani singer
 Tofig Bakikhanov (born 1930), Soviet and Azerbaijani composer
  (1928–1993), Soviet Azerbaijani composer 
  (1934–2015), Soviet and Azerbaijani composer 
  (1930–2015), Soviet and Azerbaijani composter

See also 
 People's Artist of Azerbaijan
 People's Artist
 Azerbaijan SSR

Azerbaijani awards
People's Artists of the Azerbaijan SSR
People's Artists